Tevin Imlach (born 30 November 1996) is a Guyanese cricketer. He made his List A debut for West Indies B in the 2018–19 Regional Super50 tournament on 3 October 2018. Prior to his List A debut, he was named in the West Indies squad for the 2016 Under-19 Cricket World Cup.

He made his first-class debut for Guyana in the 2018–19 Regional Four Day Competition on 6 December 2018. In June 2020, he was selected by Guyana, in the players' draft hosted by Cricket West Indies ahead of the 2020–21 domestic season.

References

External links
 

1996 births
Living people
Guyanese cricketers
Guyana cricketers
West Indies B cricketers
Place of birth missing (living people)